August Rei VR III/1 ( – 29 March 1963) was an Estonian politician, the Head of State (Riigivanem) of Estonia in 1928–1929, and the Prime Minister in duties of the President of Estonia in the government in exile in 1945–1963.

Early life and education 
August Rei was born in Kurla, Pilistvere parish, Kreis Fellin, Governorate of Livonia, Russian Empire (now Türi Parish, Järva County). Rei studied in the Tartu Emperor Alexander High School (the former State High School of the Livonian Governorate), but graduated from the Novgorod State High School. In 1904–1905 and 1907–1911, studied law in the St. Petersburg University.

Beginnings of political influence 
In 1905–1907, Rei participated in the Russian revolution of 1905. In 1906, he edited the underground paper Sotsiaaldemokraat (Social Democrat) in Tallinn. Between 1912 and 1913, he was in compulsory army service. In 1913–1914 he worked as a lawyer in Viljandi. In 1914–1917 Rei was an artillery officer in World War I at the Fort of St. Petersburg. In 1917 and 1918 he was in the Estonian army units (formed after the Second Russian Revolution in March 1917 by the initiative of Estonian politicians, who achieved the permission to concentrate the Estonian soldiers). He was the Assistant Chairman of the Supreme Committee of the Estonian military. In 1917 and 1919, he was the Editor-in-Chief of the paper Sotsiaaldemokraat. Between 1927 and 1928 he was the editor of Rahva Sõna (Word of the People). Rei was one of the leaders of the moderate faction of Estonia's social democratic movement. Up to 1936 he also worked as a lawyer and defended Ado Birk in 1927.
He received an Honorary Doctorate in Law from Tartu University.

Career 

 Member of the Estonian Provincial Assembly (Maapäev): 1917–1919
 Minister of Labour and Social Welfare of the Provisional Government; Deputy Prime Minister; Acting Minister of Education: 1918–1919
 Chairman of the Constituent Assembly (Asutav Kogu): 1919–1920
 Head of the Estonian Delegation to the Estonian-Latvian Border Committee: 1923–1925
 Speaker of the II Riigikogu; 1925–1926
 State Elder (Head of State): 4 December 1928 – 9 July 1929
 Minister of Foreign Affairs: 1932–1933
 Deputy Minister of Foreign Affairs: 1936–1937
 Envoy to the Soviet Union: 1938–1940
 Minister of Foreign Affairs in exile: 1944–1945
 Prime Minister in capacity of the President of the Republic in exile: 9 January 1945 – 29 March 1963

Literary interests 
Rei wrote and translated socialist works and published memoirs.

Awards
 1920 – Cross of Liberty III/I
 1930 – Order of the Cross of the Eagle I

Bibliography 
 Sotsialdemokraatia taktika põhimõtted Tallinnas : Tööliste kirjastusühisus, 1921 (Narva : Kärner) 
 Have the Baltic countries voluntarily renounced their freedom : an exposé based on authentic documentary evidence by August Rei. New York : World Association of Estonians, 1944 
 Have the small nations a right to freedom and independence? by August Rei. London : Boreas, 1946 
 The drama of the Baltic peoples by August Rei; preface by Eugene Lyons. Stockholm: Vaba Eesti, 1970 (Åbo : Sydvästkusten)

References

External links
 Estonian Government-in-Exile: a controversial project of state continuation by Vahur Made
 A biography of August Rei

1886 births
1963 deaths
People from Türi Parish
People from Kreis Fellin
Estonian Social Democratic Workers' Party politicians
Estonian Socialist Workers' Party politicians
Heads of State of Estonia
Ministers of Foreign Affairs of Estonia
Members of the Estonian Constituent Assembly
Members of the Riigikogu, 1920–1923
Members of the Riigikogu, 1923–1926
Members of the Riigikogu, 1926–1929
Members of the Riigikogu, 1929–1932
Members of the Riigikogu, 1932–1934
Speakers of the Riigikogu
Ambassadors of Estonia to the Soviet Union
Members of the Executive of the Labour and Socialist International
Envoys of Estonia to the Soviet Union
Estonian anti-communists
Saint Petersburg State University alumni
Military personnel of the Russian Empire
Russian military personnel of World War I
Estonian people of World War II
Recipients of the Military Order of the Cross of the Eagle, Class I
Estonian World War II refugees
Estonian emigrants to Sweden
Burials at Metsakalmistu